Jesse Lee Freitas Jr. (September 10, 1951 – February 8, 2015) was an American professional football player who was a quarterback in the National Football League (NFL). He was drafted by the San Diego Chargers in the sixth round of the 1974 NFL Draft. He played college football for the Stanford Cardinal and San Diego State Aztecs.

1972: 97/171 for 1,200 yards with 7 TD vs 14 INT.
1973: 227/347 for 2,993 yards with 21 TD vs 17 INT.

His father Jesse Sr. was a professional football player in the 1940s.

On February 8, 2015, Freitas was found dead in his car in Petaluma, California. Police officials said the Sonoma County coroner had not yet determined a cause of death.

See also
 List of NCAA major college football yearly passing leaders
 List of NCAA major college football yearly total offense leaders

References

1951 births
2015 deaths
American football quarterbacks
San Diego Chargers players
San Diego State Aztecs football players
Sportspeople from the San Francisco Bay Area
Stanford Cardinal football players
People from San Mateo, California
Players of American football from California
Junípero Serra High School (San Mateo, California) alumni